Annette Gordon-Reed, author

Gordon Reid may refer to:

 Gordon McGregor Reid (born 1948), director general and chief executive of The North of England Zoological Society
 Gordon Reid (actor) (1939–2003), Scottish actor
 Gordon Reid (businessman), Canadian businessman
 Gordon Reid (governor) (1923–1989), governor of Western Australia
 Gordon Reid (politician), member of the Australian House of Representatives
 Gordon Reid (priest) (born 1942), Anglican priest, former Dean of Gibraltar and Vicar General of the Diocese of Europe
 Gordon Reid (tennis) (born 1991), British wheelchair tennis player
 Gordon Reid (rugby union) (born 1987), Scottish rugby union player
 Gordon Reid (footballer) (1947–2010), Australian footballer for Geelong
 Gord Reid (Gordon Joseph Reid, 1910–1994), Canadian ice hockey player

Other uses
 CCGS Gordon Reid, a 1990 vessel in the Canadian Coast Guard

See also
 Gordon Reed (1913–1978), English footballer